Lasha Guruli is a Georgian boxer. He participated at the 2021 AIBA World Boxing Championships, being awarded the bronze medal in the welterweight event. Guruli also participated at the 2022 European Amateur Boxing Championships, being awarded the silver medal in the welterweight event.

References

External links 

Living people
Place of birth missing (living people)
Year of birth missing (living people)
Male boxers from Georgia (country)
Welterweight boxers
AIBA World Boxing Championships medalists
21st-century people from Georgia (country)